Prairie View Stock Farm, also known as the Bluestem Ranch, is a historic farm and national historic district in western Missouri located near Rich Hill; it covers territory in both Bates and Vernon counties. The district encompasses four contributing buildings, three contributing sites, and two contributing structures in a Rural Historic Landscape District.  The contributing sites include a hay meadow, a tall-fescue prairie, and a 160-acre plot of native, tall-grass prairie. It is a state-designated Prairie View Natural Area.  

The contributing buildings are a transverse-crib barn/grain house (c. 1879), a barn/feeding facility, a two-story, frame, folk Victorian house (1893-1894); and a frame privy (1893-1894). The contributing structures are a storm cellar (1893-1894) and an arbor (c. 1895).

It was listed on the National Register of Historic Places in 2015.

References

Historic districts on the National Register of Historic Places in Missouri
Farms on the National Register of Historic Places in Missouri
Victorian architecture in Missouri
Houses completed in 1894
Buildings and structures in Vernon County, Missouri
National Register of Historic Places in Vernon County, Missouri